The TF-1 (or Autopista del Sur, "Southern Motorway") is a motorway encircling the eastern and the southern parts of the island of Tenerife (Canary Islands). The TF-1 motorway runs from the capital Santa Cruz in the north to Adeje with its major tourist resorts Los Cristianos and Playa de las Américas in the south of the island, and continues to  Santiago del Teide in the west. It is a 103 km  motorway and interchange numbers go facing south.  The motorway is one in the Canary Islands that passes through most of the municipalities and is the longest in the archipelago as well.

Description

The motorway begins with the junction with the northern motorway TF-5 and the short TF-4 near the Canary Islands' only refinery and is 1 km south from the centre of Santa Cruz. The TF-1 follows the coastline to the Tenerife South Reina Sofia airport, then to Adeje and ends near Santiago del Teide.

History

The TF-1 motorway connected Santa Cruz de Tenerife to Candelaria first in the mid 1970s. In 1978 a very important extension to the new southern airport supported the creation of new villages on the south-east coast, like the small holiday resort of Abades and prepared the field for a phenomenal touristic expansion starting from Los Cristianos and extending to Las Americas. The famous town of Güímar was connected the same year.  In the 1990s the TF-1 was extended to Arona and in 2001 to Adeje to meet up with an increasing demand. The motorway runs from El Rosario to San Miguel de Abona over the mountain landscape and serves mountain interchanges. The part between Candelaria and Santa Cruz de Tenerife has been enlarged on 3 ways in 2008. In 2015 TF-1 was extended from Adeje to Santiago del Teide. This extension has now been completed as from January 2016, and in doing so has provided shorter and  travel distances from the mountain towns of Santiago del Teide, Tamaimo, Chio, amongst others to Adeje, Playa de las Americas, Los Cristianos, and the southern based airport Reina Sofia (TFS).
In 2012 the TF-1 was used to film action scenes for the movie Fast and Furious 6.

Current
The motorway extension suffered many delays in opening due but is now fully operational as of January 2016.

Municipalities
Santa Cruz de Tenerife (City)
El Rosario
Candelaria
Arafo
Fasnia
Güímar
Arico
San Miguel de Abona
Arona
Adeje
Guía de Isora
Santiago del Teide(inc. Tamaimo)

See also

References

Autopistas and autovías in Spain
Transport in Tenerife